Rhacel Salazar Parreñas (born February 13, 1971) is Professor of Sociology and Gender Studies at USC. She previously taught at Brown University, the University of California, Davis and the University of Wisconsin–Madison. Her research has been featured in NPR's "The World", Bloomberg News, the New York Times, the Wall Street Journal, de Volkskrant, and the American Prospect. Parreñas has written five monographs, co-edited three anthologies, and published a number of peer-reviewed articles.

Career
Parreñas received her Bachelor of Arts in Peace and Conflict Studies from University of California, Berkeley in 1992. She finished a Ph.D. in comparative ethnic studies with a designated emphasis in women, gender and sexuality from UC Berkeley in 1998. Parreñas works on issues such as gender, migration, and globalization, particularly the international division of reproductive labor, also known as the care chain. Her work has inspired books and studies, including reports released by the United Nations. The idea of the care chain also inspired the production of the documentary The Care Chain by VPRO-TV in the Netherlands.

Notable lectures available online include a public discussion on the family with other renowned social scientists held at CUNY Graduate School and a public lecture on transnational mothers that aired on WBUR, Boston's NPR station, on October 11, 2009, and January 3, 2010.

Life
Parreñas migrated to the United States in 1983, as a daughter of political refugees.

Books

Interviews

 2008 “In transnational households traditional notions of mothering and fathering are reinforced”, Interview with Rhacel Parreñas on transnational families and the gendered division of reproductive labour. In: genderstudies 13 (2008). p. 6‐7.

Awards
She has received research funding from the Ford Foundation, Rockefeller Foundation, and National Science Foundation. She was given the honors of the Edith Kreeger Wolf Distinguished Visiting Professor from Northwestern University in 2010 and the Distinguished Research Professor of Gender Studies from Ochanomizu University for the 2005-2006 academic year. For Illicit Flirtations, she received the 2012 Distinguished Scholarly Publication Award, sponsored by the American Sociological Association Labor and Labor Movements Section.  In 2003, Parreñas received an honorable mention in the Social Science Book Prize Category from the Association for Asian American Studies for Servants of Globalization. In 2019, Parrenas received the Jessie Bernard Award.

References

External links
 Rhacel Parreñas Brown University Professor, American Civilization and Sociology
 New York Times 2005 article by Nina Bernstein
 UN-instraw 
 Icarusfilms.com Chain
 BUworldofideas.org The Gender Revolution
 Rhacel Salazar Parrenas Fora.tv
 Rhacel Parreñas Website

Brown University faculty
1971 births
Living people
Family sociologists
Feminist studies scholars
American sociologists
American women sociologists
Filipino feminists
University of California, Berkeley alumni
University of Southern California faculty
Filipino women academics
21st-century American women